This is a list of top-division association futsal clubs in AFC countries. The Asian Football Confederation (AFC) includes all Asian countries except Armenia, Azerbaijan, Cyprus, Georgia, Israel, Kazakhstan and Turkey as members, but also includes the Oceanian countries of Australia, Guam, and the Northern Mariana Islands (the association of the Northern Mariana Islands is a provisional associate member of AFC but not a member of FIFA).

The football associations of Armenia, Azerbaijan, Cyprus, Georgia, Israel, Kazakhstan and Turkey are members of UEFA, the European football confederation (Israel and Kazakhstan were previously AFC members but had left). Hong Kong and Macau, the special administrative regions of the People's Republic of China, have their own football associations which are members of AFC. The Republic of China (called Chinese Taipei in the international sports community) and Palestine, both members of the IOC but not the UN, also have their own football associations which are members of AFC.

Each of the AFC member countries have their own football league systems. The clubs playing in each top-level league compete for the title as the country's club champions, and also for places in next season's AFC club competitions, i.e., the AFC Futsal Club Championship. Due to promotion and relegation, the clubs playing in the top-level league are different every season; however, some league systems do not have promotion and relegation.

Afghanistan
Football association: Afghanistan Football Federation

Australia
Football association: Football Federation Australia
Top-level league: F-League

Bahrain
Football association: Bahrain Football Association

Bangladesh
Football association: Bangladesh Football Federation

Bhutan
Football association: Bhutan Football Federation

Brunei

Cambodia
Football association: Cambodian Football Federation

People's Republic of China
Football association: Football Association of the People's Republic of China
Top-level league: Chinese Futsal League

Republic of China (Chinese Taipei)
See Chinese Taipei for the naming issue.

Football association: Chinese Taipei Football Association

East Timor (Timor-Leste)

Football association: Federaçao Futebol Timor-Leste

Guam
Football association: Guam Football Association

Hong Kong
Football association: The Hong Kong Football Association
Top-level league: Hong Kong Futsal League

As of 2010–11 season:
 Homeless
 HKIED
 Kitchee
 Milk
 South China
 TSW Pegasus

India
Football association: All India Football Federation
Top-level league: Premier Futsal
As of 2017 season:

Mumbai Warriors  
Delhi Dragons  
Kerala Cobras 
Bengaluru Royals  
 Telugu Tigers 
Chennai Singhams

Indonesia
Football association: Football Association of Indonesia
Top-level league: Indonesian Futsal League

As of 2012 season (Best Teams) :
Electric PLN (Jakarta)
IPC Pelindo (Jakarta)
Futsal Kota Bandung (West Java)
SWAP FC 
Brilyan Sport FC 
Trunajaya (West Java)
Jaya Kencana United (South Tangerang)
The Owl SMPN 1 Cirebon

Iran
Football association: Islamic Republic of Iran Football Federation
Top-level league: Iranian Futsal Super League

As of 2013–14 season:

Iraq
Football association: Iraq Football Association

Japan
Football association: Japan Football Association
Top-level league: F. League

As of 2012–13 season:

Jordan
Football association: Jordan Football Association

Korea DPR
Football association: DPR Korea Football Association

Korea Republic
Football association: Korea Football Association
Top-level league: FK-League

As of 2012–13 season:
 Fantasia Bucheon FS
 Gyeongsan Osung FC
 Jecheon FS
 Jeonju MAG FC
 FS Seoul
 Seoul Eunpyeong FS
 Seoul Gwangjin FC
 Yes Gumi FC
 Yongin FS

Kuwait
Football association: Kuwait Football Association

Kyrgyzstan
Football association: Football Federation of Kyrgyz Republic
Top-level league: Kyrgyzstan Futsal League

As of 2011 season:

Laos
Football association: Lao Football Federation

Lebanon
Football association: Federation Libanaise de Football

Macau
Football association: Macau Football Association

Malaysia
Football association: Football Association of Malaysia
Top-level league: Malaysia Premier Futsal League

As of 2019 season:

Maldives
Football association: Football Association of Maldives

Mongolia
Football association: Mongolian Football Federation

Myanmar

Football association: Myanmar Football Federation

Nepal
Football association: All Nepal Football Association

Northern Mariana Islands
Football association: Northern Mariana Islands Football Association

Oman
Football association: Oman Football Association

Pakistan
Football association: Pakistan Football Federation

Palestine
Football association: Palestinian Football Federation

Philippines
Football association: Philippine Football Federation

Qatar
Football association: Qatar Football Association
Top-level league: Qatar Futsal League
Table as of 2011-12 Season

Saudi Arabia
Football association: Saudi Arabia Football Federation

Singapore
Football association: Football Association of Singapore

Sri Lanka
Football association: Football Federation of Sri Lanka

Syria
Football association: Syrian Arab Federation for Football

Tajikistan
Football association: Tajikistan Football Federation

Thailand
Football association: Football Association of Thailand
Top-level league: Thailand Futsal League

Competition of 16 club in 2012-13 league
 Bangkok F.C.
 CAT F.C.
 Hongyen Tha Kham Samut Songkhram Futsal Club
 Nonthaburi Futsal Club
 G.H. RBAC Chonburi
 Rajnavy
 Samut Prakan Futsal Club
 Samut Sakhon Futsal Club
 Sripatum Sunlite Sisaket 
 Surat Thani Lightning Shrimps
 Thai Port Futsal Club
 Lampang United Pathum Kongka
 Highways Department FC
 Leo Bang Sue
 Phuket United
 Prachinburi Thai Tobacco Monopoly Futsal Club

Turkmenistan
Football association: Football Association of Turkmenistan

United Arab Emirates
Football association: United Arab Emirates Football Association

Uzbekistan
Football association: Uzbekistan Football Federation
Top-level league: Uzbekistan Futsal League

As of 2012 Uzbekistan Futsal League season:
{| class="wikitable" style="text-align: center;"
|Club
|-
||Ardus Tashkent
|-
||Lokomotiv Tashkent
|-
||Stroitel Zarafshan
|-
||Bunyodkor Tashkent
|-
||Maksam Chirchik
|-
||Kagan
|-
||Turon-S Andijan
|-
||Pahtakor Tashkent|}

Vietnam
Football association: Vietnam Football Federation
Top-level league: Vietnam futsal championshipCompetition of 8 club in 2015 league second-stage''':

Sanna Khanh Hoa
Thai Son Bac
Thai Son Nam
Sannatech Khanh Hoa
Tan Hiep Hung
HT Da Nang
HPN Phu Nhuan
Binh Thuan

Yemen
Football association: Yemen Football Association

See also
List of top-division futsal clubs in UEFA countries

References

National Associations, AFC. Last accessed October 31, 2006.
The RSSSF Archive - Domestic Results (Asia and Oceania), Rec.Sport.Soccer Statistics Foundation. Last accessed October 30, 2006.

Asia